Infinite Dimensional Analysis, Quantum Probability and Related Topics is a quarterly peer-reviewed scientific journal published since 1998 by World Scientific. It covers the development of infinite dimensional analysis, quantum probability, and their applications to classical probability and other areas of physics.

Abstracting and indexing 
The journal is abstracted and indexed in CompuMath Citation Index, Current Contents/Physical, Chemical & Earth Sciences, Mathematical Reviews, Science Citation Index, Scopus, and Zentralblatt MATH. According to the Journal Citation Reports, the journal has a 2020 impact factor of 0.793.

References

External links 
 

Mathematics journals
Publications established in 1988
World Scientific academic journals
English-language journals
Quarterly journals